Gordon Slater may refer to:

 Gordon Slater (carillonneur) (born 1950), Canadian carillonneur, bassoonist, conductor and organist
 Gordon Slater (rugby union) (born 1971), former rugby player from New Zealand
 Gordon Archbold Slater (1896–1979), English cathedral organist